Matthias J. Regan (sometimes spelled Mathias; February 16, 1848 – January 5, 1931) was a member of the Wisconsin State Assembly.

Biography
Regan was born on February 16, 1848, in what is now Eagle (town), Wisconsin. He married Julia Dalo. They had four children. Regan died in 1931.

Career
Regan was a member of the Assembly in 1883. Other positions he held include town clerk and chairman of the town board (similar to city council) of Eagle and member of the county board of supervisors of Waukesha County, Wisconsin. He was a Democrat.

References

External links
Wisconsin Historical Society

Democratic Party members of the Wisconsin State Assembly
Wisconsin city council members
County supervisors in Wisconsin
City and town clerks
1848 births
1931 deaths
Burials in Wisconsin
People from Eagle, Wisconsin